Huppenkothen GmbH & Co KG is a company specializing in compact and mini excavators in Europe. It was founded in 1956 in Bregenz.

Besides Takeuchi compact and mini excavators, the company also sells and rents out dumpers, skid steer loaders, wheel loaders, single drum rollers and tracked carriers..

History
Huppenkothen was founded in Bregenz (Vorarlberg) in 1956. From 1979 on, the enterprise sold the first mini excavator rotable at 360° “Pel-Job” (Takeuchi TKB1000), which had been invented by the Japanese inventor Akio Takeuchi in 1971. Since then, significant technological progress has been made in the industry of mini and compact excavators. Huppenkothen also grew so that they could expand into Austrian as well as Eastern European and Iberian Peninsula markets.

External links 
 Website of Huppenkothen GmbH & Co KG (German/English/French/Spanish)
 Website of Takeuchi Mfg. Co., Ltd. (English/Japanese)

Manufacturing companies of Austria
Manufacturing companies established in 1956
Austrian companies established in 1956
Economy of Vorarlberg